The 1968 North Dakota gubernatorial election was held on November 5, 1968. Incumbent Democrat William L. Guy defeated Republican nominee Robert P. McCarney with 54.82% of the vote.

Primary elections
Primary elections were held on September 3, 1968.

Democratic primary

Candidates
William L. Guy, incumbent Governor

Results

Republican primary

Candidates
Robert P. McCarney
Edward W. Doherty

Results

General election

Candidates
Major party candidates
William L. Guy, Democratic
Robert P. McCarney, Republican 

Other candidates
Leo Landsberger, Independent

Results

References

1968
North Dakota
Gubernatorial